Ready 2 Rumble Boxing is a boxing video game developed by Midway Studios San Diego, published by Midway Games in 1999 for the Dreamcast, PlayStation, Game Boy Color, and Nintendo 64. The success of the Dreamcast version led to it becoming one of the few Sega All Stars titles.

Like Nintendo's Punch-Out!! series, it features many characters with colorful personalities (i.e. Afro Thunder, Boris "The Bear" Knokimov, etc.); however, unlike the Punch-Out!! series, Ready 2 Rumble Boxing is in 3D, thus allowing for more control over one's character in the ring. Also unlike Punch-Out!!, players can choose whichever boxer they want from a rather large selection of characters.

Throughout the fights in the game, there is a special RUMBLE meter which fills up, one or two letters at a time, until the word "RUMBLE" is spelled at the bottom of the screen. Letters can be obtained by successfully landing hard blows; most such actions will yield one letter, though some particularly strong punches may yield more. Once the meter is full, the player can power himself up, enabling access to a special combo called "Rumble Flurry", activated by pressing a button combination. Each character's "flurry" is unique to them, and consists of a series of punches which does a large amount of damage if landed successfully.

One unique graphic feature of the game is the gradual bruises gained by players as the fight progresses (like hematomas and swellings), present in all fifth-generation versions. While this is not necessarily a new feature to games (it had been implemented before in SNK's 1992 game Art of Fighting), it garnered much appraisal from reviewers, because of the added fun factor this element supplied to the game.

The Game Boy Color version was one of the few games for the system to feature built-in rumble.

The Dreamcast, PlayStation, and Nintendo 64 versions each have an exclusive boxer: these are, respectively, Jimmy Blood, Gino Stiletto, and J.R. Flurry.

Ring announcer Michael Buffer appears in the game as himself.

Development
The game was showcased at E3 1999.

Marketing

Ready 2 Rumble Boxing commercials were produced by MTV. The commercials mimicked that of the  Who Framed Roger Rabbit film where animated characters fraternize with humans.

Reception

The game received "favorable" reviews on all platforms except the Game Boy Color version, which received "mixed" reviews, according to the review aggregation website GameRankings. Chris Charla of NextGen said of the Dreamcast original in its November 1999 issue, "With fast action, seriously funny character design, and excellent graphics, Midway once again proves it's untouchable when it comes to arcade sports." Two issues later, however, Adam Pavlacka said of the Nintendo 64 version, "After playing the Dreamcast version for months, it is hard for us to accept an inferior version of the game, even if it does play just as well." In Japan, where the Dreamcast version was ported and published by Sega under the name  on January 13, 2000, Famitsu gave it a score of 28 out of 40.

Dan Elektro of GamePro said of the Dreamcast original in one review, "With its unique look, awesome two-player matchups, and high replay value, Ready 2 Rumble Boxing makes the hungry young Dreamcast look like a true contender." In another review, Scary Larry said that the same Dreamcast version was "far and away better than [Punch-Out!! and Super Punch-Out!!], and one of the most fun boxing games you'll ever find. The only flaw you may find is that the game is easy to beat, and once you're done, you're done. Want realism? Buy Knockout Kings. Want something fun and playable? Ready to Rumble is the king of the ring." Boba Fatt said of the Nintendo 64 version in one review, "It may not be as pretty as its Dreamcast version, but R2RB still rocks the N64 with a one-two audio/visual combination, finishing the job with an outstanding right hook for personality." However, iBot said in another review that the same N64 version was "is inferior to the Dreamcast version, maybe more so than it should be. But what's most important is that the raucous gameplay is still there . If you don't have a Dreamcast and don't plan on getting one (shame on you), then definitely jump into the ring with this game. Otherwise you'll be missing out on a brawlin' good time." Major Mike's review of the PlayStation version called it "a pick-up-and-play boxing game that's short on learning, long on fun – and it all occurs without messy reality getting in the way." The D-Pad Destroyer said of the same console version in another review, "On its own merits, Ready 2 Rumble takes the PSX places it's never been. Unfortunately, the Dreamcast has been there, done that, and burned the bridges behind it. If you've never played the DC version, and you don't think you ever will, this version is really not bad at all. It's just a PlayStation version of a very impressive Dreamcast title, and the PlayStation just isn't quite up to snuff."

Mark Green of N64 Magazine gave the Nintendo 64 version 81%, saying, "If you're looking for something to fill the gap between wrestling titles, ''Ready 2 Rumble is just about adequate. But with Knockout Kings 2000 out there, and Smash Bros and Wrestlemania offering more accomplished knockabout fighting, it's hard to get excited about the game. We'll applaud Midway for creating a fighter with a sense of humour and a real 'personality' – it's just a shame the fighting itself isn't as much fun."

The Dreamcast version was a finalist for the Academy of Interactive Arts & Sciences' 3rd Annual Interactive Achievement Awards for 1999's "Console Fighting Game of the Year", which ultimately went to Soulcalibur. The game did win the "9th Annual GamePro Readers' Choice Awards" for "Best Boxing Game".

Sequel
The game was followed by a sequel in 2000 called Ready 2 Rumble Boxing: Round 2, and was later followed by a third game in the series, Ready 2 Rumble: Revolution, released on March 17, 2009.

Afro Thunder is featured in TNA iMPACT! upon gaining 750,000 style points and TNA iMPACT!: Cross The Line upon unlocking the Freedom Center arena.

Notes

References

External links

1999 video games
Boxing video games
Dreamcast games
Game Boy Color games
Midway video games
Nintendo 64 games
PlayStation (console) games
Sega games
Video games developed in the United States
Multiplayer and single-player video games
Video games based on real people